The Dongfeng CA71 is a medium-sized limousine made by the Chinese automobile manufacturer First Automotive Works (FAW) and produced in small numbers in 1958. It was the first passenger car to be produced entirely in China.

History of development
The Dongfeng CA71 was developed by FAW in Changchun (Manchuria). FAW was founded in 1953 with technical and financial support from the Soviet Union. It primarily produced commercial vehicles, especially heavy trucks based on the Soviet model.  In 1958 China launched the Great Leap Forward Campaign, which was aimed at catching up with the Western industrialized countries.

From 1958, several Chinese plants, including FAW began to design passenger cars for civilian use.

The Dongfeng CA71 was used for a number of propaganda campaigns and some included Mao Zedong. About 30 Dongfeng CA71s were produced. Because the CA71 was small, the Hongqi CA72 was the preferred state limousines. Middle officials tended to use the smaller Fenghuang (Shanghai SH760).

Design
The Dongfeng CA71 was modeled on two foreign vehicles. The chassis is stylistically similar to the Mercedes-Benz W120 as was its 1.9 litre four-cylinder in-line engine. The body was based on the French Simca Vedette, although its actual shape is closer to the similar sized Ford Zephyr Mk2 of the same era. This was possibly due to Ford's relationship with Simca at the time. 

Chinese detailing included a golden dragon motif on the bonnet grill, and elements of a Chinese lantern design on the taillights, like the Hongqi CA72.

FAW's Deputy Design Director, Shi Qihe, and Chief Engineer, Hu Tongxun directed the project.

Production
The first prototype of the Dongfeng CA71 was completed on 12 May 1958.  Various test drives followed in the summer. Several more copies were built in 1958. The car was hand made with the sheet metal being hand-braided. Only two examples are known to still exist. One is kept at the Hongqi Factory Museum in Changchun and a replica based on the Soviet GAZ-21 is located in the Beijing Classic Car Museum.

Hongqi would not market another passenger vehicle shorter than the main Hongqi limousines until the 1960s-1970s with the Hongqi CA771 and 773 models, themselves SWB versions of the Hongqi CA770 limousines.

References

FAW Group vehicles
Cars of China
Cars introduced in 1958